Al-Abroh is a sub-district located in al-Sabrah District, Ibb Governorate, Yemen. Al-Abroh had a population of 5522 according to the 2004 census.

References 

Sub-districts in As Sabrah District